The National Defense Authorization Act for Fiscal Year 2014 (NDAA 2014, Pub.L 113-66) is a United States federal law which specifies the budget and expenditures of the United States Department of Defense (DOD) for Fiscal Year 2014. The law authorizes the DOD to spend $607 billion in Fiscal Year 2014.

The bill passed the U.S. Senate on December 19, 2013, the 53rd consecutive year that a National Defense Authorization Act had been passed.

Background
During the 113th United States Congress, four separate bills each titled the "National Defense Authorization Act for Fiscal Year 2014" were introduced.

Summary of the bill
The bill authorizes various programs in the United States Army, United States Marine Corps, United States Navy, and the United States Air Force, including requirements for reports and placing future spending caps. The bill also formally revises the Uniform Code of Military Justice to improve its ability to handle both the victims and perpetrators sexual assault, and to decriminalize consensual sodomy.

Specific provisions of the bill
 Pentagon-run anti-narcotics programs
 helping the Jordanian military secure its border with Syria
 funding for the destruction of chemical weapons in Syria
 Prohibition on new combat or camouflage utility uniforms not adopted by all the services. (Section 352)

Procedural history
The NDAA 2014 was introduced into the United States House of Representatives on October 22, 2013 by Rep. Theodore E. Deutch (D, FL-21). It was referred to the United States House Committee on Armed Services. On October 28, 2013, the House voted to pass the bill by a voice vote. It was received in the United States Senate and referred to the United States Senate Committee on Armed Services on October 29, 2013. The Senate passed the bill on November 19, 2013, with amendments. The House agreed to the Senate amendments and added their own amendments on December 12, 2013. The compromise agreement was structured in a "fast-track process that precludes senators from tacking on controversial amendments dealing with Iran sanctions and other divisive issues." The Senate agreed to those amendments on December 19, 2013 in Roll Call Vote 284 by a vote of 84–15. On December 26, 2013, President Barack Obama signed the bill into law.

Debate and discussion

Supporters
Senator Carl Levin said that "the bill before us is not a Democratic bill and it is not a Republican bill. It is a bipartisan, bicameral defense bill." He argued that the bill "ensures that important pay and benefits, including combat pay, will continue; includes powerful and important new tools in our fight against military sexual assault; and makes progress toward the day we can close the detention camp at Guantanamo Bay."

Criticism
The bill was criticized for spending too much money. Director of the Arms & Security Project William Hartung of the Center for International Policy said that "the passage of a National Defense Authorization Act (NDAA) that calls for $30 billion more for the Pentagon and allied agencies than is contained in the recent budget deal passed by both houses of Congress is just the latest indication that defense hawks continue to live in their own world, untroubled by fiscal constraints." President Ryan Alexander of the group Taxpayers for Common Sense opposed over spending in the bill, including a provision of the bill that authorized the DOD to spend money on a weapons system that they did not request money to buy. That provision was $178 million for M-1 Abrams tanks.

Moreover, the NDAA provision (first signed into law in 2012) which permits the military to detain individuals indefinitely without trial, remains in 2014. A lawsuit filed by plaintiffs including journalist Chris Hedges, Noam Chomsky and Daniel Ellsberg against the provision has been aggressively fought at every turn by the government's attorneys. The plaintiffs argue that the NDAA provision constitutes a significant expansion of the laws regarding indefinite detention already established by Authorization for Use of Military Force Against Terrorists (AUMF).

See also
 List of bills in the 113th United States Congress
 National Defense Authorization Act
 Howard P. "Buck" McKeon National Defense Authorization Act for Fiscal Year 2015 (H.R. 4435; 113th Congress) – one of the proposed NDAA bills for fiscal year 2015

External links

General tracking of the bill:
 beta.congress.gov H.R. 3304
 Library of Congress H.R. 3304
 govtrack.us H.R. 3304
 Washingtonwatch.com H.R. 3304
 OpenCongress.org H.R. 3304

Summaries:
 House Republican Conference's legislative digest on H.R. 3304 – House Republicans
 Highlights of H.R. 3304: Final FY14 Defense Authorization Bill – December 16, 2103 summary from Senator John Barrasso, Chairman of the Senate Republican Policy Committee
 Analysis of the FY 2014 National Defense Authorization Bill, H.R. 3304 – December 17, 2013 summary from the Center for Arms Control and Non-Proliferation. Emphasizes info on nuclear weapons and missile defense
 SASC leaders reach agreement with House counterparts on defense authorization – December 9, 2013 summary from Democratic Senator Carl Levin (Chairman of the Senate Arms Services Committee)

Official Statements:
 President Obama's Statement on signing H.R. 3304

References 

Acts of the 113th United States Congress
2013 in LGBT history
2014 in LGBT history
U.S. National Defense Authorization Acts
LGBT rights in the United States
Sexual orientation and the United States military